Aliabad-e Mir (also Romanized as ‘Alīābād-e Mīr; also known as ‘Alīābād, ‘Aliābād-i-Buzurg, and Ali Abad Kheyrood Kenar) is a village in Kheyrud Kenar Rural District, in the Central District of Nowshahr County, Mazandaran Province, Iran. At the 2006 census, its population was 3,065, in 816 families.

References 

Populated places in Nowshahr County